Julius Fast (April 17, 1919 – December 16, 2008) was an American author of both fiction and non-fiction. In 1946 he was the first recipient of the Edgar Award given by the Mystery Writers of America for the best first novel of 1945.

Fast was born in Manhattan, the younger brother of novelist Howard Fast. Majoring in pre-med, he earned a bachelor's degree at New York University. He was in the United States Army Medical Corps for three years, serving in a blood lab in Boston and became a sergeant. He edited Out of This World, a 1944 collection of science fiction stories while he was still in the Army.

He married author Barbara Sher in 1946. They co-wrote the 1979 book Talking Between the Lines: How We Mean More Than We Say. Their three children are: Jennie Gelfand, Dr. Melissa Morgan and Timothy Fast. In 1997, Fast and his son co-authored The Legal Atlas of the United States.

His first novel, Watchful at Night, written in 1945 while he was still serving in the Army, was given the first award presented at the inaugural Edgar Allan Poe Award in 1946 for Best First Novel by an American Author in 1945. Reviewer Isaac Anderson of The New York Times described his 1947 novel Walk in Shadow as a "profoundly moving novel of crime and punishment, telling the story of a once-honest man who becomes a murderer.

Fast wrote and edited for a number of medical magazines, where his time employed at a podiatry journal provided the background he needed to write the 1970 book You and Your Feet. Other non-fiction works reflected a broad range of subjects, including the 1968 book The Beatles: The Real Story, The New Sexual Fulfillment published in 1972 and his 1979 book Weather Language. His 1988 semiautobiographical novel What Should We Do About Davey? described a gawky teen at a Catskill Mountains summer camp for boys.

He wrote a number of books on request for publishers on subjects of current interest, including writing What You Should Know About Human Sexual Response in months after the 1966 publication of Human Sexual Response by Masters and Johnson.

He died at age 89 in Kingston, New York on December 16, 2008, after suffering a stroke in 2007.

WorksOut of This World. an anthology edited by Julius Fast, Penguin Books, 1944.Watchful at Night. Farrar & Rinehart, Inc., 1945.The Bright Face of Danger. Rinehart & Company, 1946.Walk in Shadow. Rinehart & Company, 1947.The Iron Cradle, Thomas Y. Crowell Co., 1954.A Model for Murder. Rinehart & Company, 1956.Street of Fear. Rinehart & Company, 1958.Doctor Harry. (under the pseudonym Adam Barnett), Thomas Y. Crowell Co., 1958.Blueprint for Life. St. Martin’s Press, 1964.What You Should Know About Human Sexual Response., G.P. Putnam’s Sons, 1966.The Beatles: The Real Story. G.P. Putnam’s Sons, 1968.Body Language. Simon & Schuster Adult Publishing Group, 1970.The League of the Grey Eyed Women. J.B. Lippencott Co., 1970.The Incompatibility of Men and Women and how to Overcome it.  M. Evans & Company, 1971.You and Your Feet. Pelham Books, 1971.The New Sexual Fulfillment. Berkley Press, 1972.Bisexual Living. M. Evans & Company, 1975.The Pleasure Book. Stein & Day Publishing, 1975.The Body Language of Sex Power and Aggression. M. Evans and Co., 1977.Creative Coping : A Guide to Positive Living. (with Barbara Fast),  Morrow, 1976.Psyching Up: Over 50 Good Ideas for a Slimmer, Sexier, Healthier You. Stein & Day, 1978.Weather Language. Wyden Books, 1979.Talking Between the Lines: How We Mean More Than We Say. (with Barbara Fast) Viking Press, 1979.Body Politics Tower Books. 1980,.The Omega-3 breakthrough. Body Press, c1987.Sexual Chemistry: What it Is, how to Use it. M. Evans & Company, 1983.Ladies man: an autobiography. by Paul Henreid with Julius Fast, St. Martin’s Press, c1984,What Should we do about Davey?. St. Martin’s Press, 1988.Subtext: Making Body Language Work in the Workplace. Viking Press, 1991.The Legal Atlas of the United States. Facts on File, 1997.A Trunkful of Trouble''. Gryphon Books, 2003.

Sources

References

External links

1919 births
2008 deaths
Jewish American writers
Edgar Award winners
New York University alumni
People from Manhattan
United States Army non-commissioned officers
20th-century American male writers
United States Army personnel of World War II
20th-century American Jews
21st-century American Jews